Hunter Valentine is an alternative rock band formed in 2004 in Toronto, Ontario, Canada.  Hunter Valentine have a moderate fan base in southern Ontario.

History
The current members of Hunter Valentine are Kiyomi McCloskey, Laura Petracca, Leanne Bowes and Aimee Bessada. They signed with True North Records in fall 2006, and released their first full-length album, The Impatient Romantic, on April 10, 2007. Hunter Valentine has also been the staff band at Buck's Rock Performing and Creative Arts Camp in New Milford, Connecticut.
In the fall of 2009, the band recorded a self-funded 7 song album with Ian Blurton after they were released by True North Records.
The band traveled to NYC numerous times hoping to attract attention from labels, and signed with Tommy Boy shortly after.
In 2010, they released an EP titled "Lessons From The Late Night", which released in Canada on April 17, and then released worldwide on May 11 of the same year.
In 2012, Hunter Valentine's  tour was documented on Season 3 of the television series The Real L Word on Showtime. They were the opening act for Cyndi Lauper in 2013 on the North American leg of the She's So Unusual: 30th Anniversary Tour. In July 2014, Hunter Valentine joined the lineup for traveling rock festival Vans Warped Tour, and was featured on VH1's Make or Break: The Linda Perry Project that same summer.

Members

Kiyomi McCloskey
Kiyomi McCloskey is the lead guitarist and vocalist in the band Hunter Valentine. She has cited Neil Young, Rolling Stones, Robert Johnson, Lucinda Williams and Janis Joplin as influences. McCloskey was featured on the third season of the series The Real L Word, a lesbian based TV show on Showtime.

Laura Petracca
Laura Petracca is the drummer in Hunter Valentine. She began playing drums at a very young age, and competed successfully in many local drum competitions. She was inspired by many classic rock and grunge rock artists.

Leanne Bowes
Leanne is the newest bassist for Hunter Valentine, joining in early 2013.

Lisa Bianco
Lisa Bianco plays the guitar and keyboard and joined the band in 2014.

Past members

Aimee Bessada
Aimee played guitar and keyboards in the band. She left Hunter Valentine during the course of the production of Make or Break: The Linda Perry Project in 2014.

Adrienne Lloyd
Adrienne Lloyd began her musical career at a young age. She studied many bass types, but particularly the upright bass performance. She is a classically trained bassist.

Somer Bingham
Somer Bingham plays guitar and keyboards. She met Kiyomi when her band shared a bill with Hunter Valentine at a venue in the East Village in 2008.  Somer also fronts her own project, Clinical Trials, a grunge/punk/electro duo based in Brooklyn.

Veronica Sanchez
Veronica, aka Vero, left Hunter Valentine earlier in 2013. She played bass guitar.

Touring Bands
They have toured Southern Ontario with bands such as, The Cliks, Dragonette, Kids on TV, Kelly and the Kelly Girls, Scandalnavia, Clothes Make the Man, Dead Letter Dept., Hexes and Ohs, Drowning Girl, Love Kills, Dance Yourself to Death, Sam Roberts, Sick of Sarah, Social Code, and Queen Caveat. In 2012 they toured with Sum 41 and IAmDynamite, and in 2013 they toured with Cyndi Lauper as her opening act in North America.

Discography

Album
The Impatient Romantic (2007)
Collide and Conquer (2012)

EP
Hunter Valentine EP
Lessons From The Late Night (2010)
The Pledge (2016)

Music videos

See also

Music of Canada
Canadian rock
List of Canadian musicians
List of bands from Canada
:Category:Canadian musical groups

References

External links
Love, sex and rock ‘n’ roll with Hunter Valentine - TorontoMusicScene.ca
Hunter Valentine official website
Ian Blurton
Interview with Kiyomi

Musical groups established in 2004
Canadian alternative rock groups
Musical groups from Toronto
All-female bands
2004 establishments in Ontario